Barnhart is a surname. Notable people with the surname include:

Berta Barnhart, member of Seattle City Planning Commission
Brian Barnhart, American auto racing executive
Clarence Barnhart (1900-1993), American lexicographer
Clyde Barnhart (1895-1980), American baseball player
Dan Barnhart (born 1912), American football player
David Barnhart (born 1941), American lexicographer
Ed Barnhart (born 1968), American archaeologist and explorer
Edgar Barnhart (1904-1984), American baseball pitcher
Frank A. Barnhart, American actor and director
Gordon Barnhart (born 1945), Canadian politician
Henry A. Barnhart (1858-1934), American politician
Jeffrey L. Barnhart (born 1956), American politician
Jennifer Barnhart (born 1972), American puppeteer and actress
Jo Anne B. Barnhart (born 1950), American civil servant
John Hendley Barnhart (1871-1949), American botanist and author
Katie Barnhart, American figure skater
Keith Barnhart (born 1962), American musician
Les Barnhart (1905-1971), American baseball player
Mitch Barnhart (born 1959), American athletic director
Nicole Barnhart (born 1981), American soccer goalkeeper
Peter Barnhart, Canadian settler
Phil Barnhart (born 1946), American politician
Phyllis Barnhart (1922-2008), American animator and cel painter
Ray Barnhart (1928–2013), American politician
Robert Barnhart (1933-2007), American lexicographer
Tony Barnhart (born 1953), American reporter
Tucker Barnhart (born 1991), American baseball player
Vic Barnhart (born 1921), American baseball player

Surnames from given names